North American Rotorwerks LLC is an American aircraft manufacturer based in Tukwila, Washington, founded by John Vanvoorhees. The company specializes in the design and manufacture of autogyros in the form of kits for amateur construction.

The company's Pitbull Ultralight and SS models as well as their Pitbull II are intended to resemble the tractor configuration radial engine-equipped autogyro designs that were popular in the 1930s. The designs utilize Dragon Blade rotors made by Rotor Flight Dynamics.

By December 2014 the US Federal Aviation Administration had six Pitbull autogyros on its aircraft registry, although eight had been registered at one time.

Founded circa 2008, by February 2013 the company website carried a note indicating that production had been suspended "due to changing circumstances".

Aircraft

References

External links

Aircraft manufacturers of the United States
Autogyros
Homebuilt aircraft